Marcos Antônio Cezar (born 27 June 1970) is a Brazilian handball player. He competed in the men's tournament at the 1996 Summer Olympics.

References

External links
 
 
 

1970 births
Living people
Brazilian male handball players
Olympic handball players of Brazil
Handball players at the 1996 Summer Olympics
Sportspeople from Santa Catarina (state)